Prostanthera ringens, commonly known as gaping mint-bush, is a species of flowering plant in the family Lamiaceae and is endemic to eastern Australia. It is a bushy shrub with four-sided, hairy, densely glandular branches, oblong or egg-shaped leaves and pale blue to greenish or yellow flowers arranged singly in leaf axils.

Description

Taxonomy
Prostanthera ringens was first formally described in 1848 by George Bentham in Thomas Mitchell's Journal of an Expedition into the Interior of Australia.

Distribution and habitat
Gaping mint-bush grows on rocky sandstone ridges, on stony hills and in forest on the western slopes and plains of New South Wales north from near Mendooran and in eastern central Queensland, including in the Darling Downs, Maranoa and Mitchell districts.

Conservation status
Prostanthera ringens is classified as of "least concern" in Queensland under the Queensland Government Nature Conservation Act 1992.

References

ringens
Flora of New South Wales
Flora of Queensland
Lamiales of Australia
Plants described in 1848
Taxa named by George Bentham